Hancock Butte is a  summit located in the Grand Canyon, in Coconino County of northern Arizona, US. Its nearest higher neighbor is Mount Hayden, one mile to the north-northeast, Kibbey Butte is one mile to the south-southwest, and Brady Peak is 1.5 mile to the southeast. Hancock Butte is named after William A. Hancock (1831–1902), a pioneer and politician of the Arizona Territory known for performing the survey work required to create the town of Phoenix and erecting the first building there in 1870. This geographical feature's name was officially adopted in 1932 by the U.S. Board on Geographic Names. According to the Köppen climate classification system, Hancock Butte is located in a Cold semi-arid climate zone.

Geology

Hancock Butte is a butte topped by Esplanade Sandstone, part of the Pennsylvanian-Permian Supai Group overlaying the cliff-forming Mississippian Redwall Limestone. Precipitation runoff from this feature drains east into the Colorado River via Nankoweap Creek.

Gallery

See also
 Geology of the Grand Canyon area

References

External links 
 Weather forecast: National Weather Service

Grand Canyon, North Rim
Grand Canyon
Landforms of Coconino County, Arizona
Buttes of Arizona
North American 2000 m summits
Colorado Plateau
Grand Canyon National Park